Jamie Anthony Lotun-Raines (born 19 February 1994) is an English YouTuber and LGBT advocate. His videos include commentary on gender identity and other LGBTQ+ issues as well as general lifestyle topics. Raines is a trans man and has documented his gender transition, including the effects of hormone replacement therapy and gender reassignment surgery. His channel, Jammidodger, has over one million subscribers.

Early and personal life
Raines is from Colchester in Essex. He attended St Mary's School in Colchester, and later Colchester Sixth Form College. He has not disclosed his deadname, and has stated that he sees no reason for others to know it.

Raines recalls feeling like a boy from the age of four. At the age of 16, he realized he was transgender after watching a documentary involving a trans man and relating to their shared experiences. He describes his family and close friends as being immediately supportive and choosing the name Jamie with their help. In order to document the physical changes he underwent during his transition, Raines took a photograph of himself each day for three years.

Raines is married to fellow YouTuber Shaaba Lotun-Raines (née Lotun). Both are bisexual. The two met in a college art class and became close friends prior to Raines' transition. When Raines came out, Lotun's family initially disapproved of their relationship, but quickly grew to support the two's relationship. Each makes semi-regular appearances on the other's YouTube channel.

Raines received his Gender Recognition Certificate late in 2019, which allows him to be recognised as a man in marriage. He describes this as marking the end of his transition process. The couple had initially planned to marry in 2020 but they chose to delay the wedding due to COVID-19 travel restrictions, which would have prevented members of Lotun's Mauritian extended family from attending, eventually marrying in 2022.

Career

YouTube
Raines started the YouTube channel Jammidodger in 2011. The title is a reference to his name and to Jammie Dodgers, a popular type of biscuit in the UK. Having found YouTube videos to be a useful resource when discovering his own gender identity, he started the channel to provide a UK perspective on the transition process as well as to document the process for himself.

Over time the channel has evolved to cover broader LGBT+ issues and also more general lifestyle content such as reacting to internet memes and subreddits, and reviewing cat toys. Raines was prominent among the many YouTubers to make videos criticising the views about trans people expressed by J. K. Rowling.

In 2020, both Raines and Lotun made videos as part of Southend Council's Protect Your Fam project to encourage social distancing, hand-washing and mask wearing during the COVID-19 pandemic.

In addition to frequently appearing in videos with his wife, Shaaba, Raines has made videos collaborating with other YouTubers such as Jessica Kellgren-Fozard and Noah Finnce.

Research
Raines has a master's degree and a PhD in Psychology from the University of Essex. He was awarded his doctorate in 2021. He has conducted research into the sexual response of transgender men as well as other topics related to gender and sexuality.

Writing
Raines' first book, The T in LGBT: Everything you need to know about being trans, is scheduled for release in June 2023 published by Ebury Publishing's Vermilion imprint.

Reception
Raines series of daily selfies, which he took during three years of his gender transition, were compiled into a 20-second montage for the Channel 4 television documentary Girls To Men

Raines was featured in the Channel 4 documentary series Bride and Prejudice covering the tensions within Lotun's family in the run up to their engagement.

Awards
In 2020, Raines was a finalist in the LGBTQ+ Account section at the 12th Shorty Awards.

In 2022, Raines won the Online Influencer award at the British LGBT Awards.

References

External links

Living people
1994 births
Alumni of the University of Essex
Bisexual entertainers
Bisexual men
Commentary YouTubers
English YouTubers
English LGBT rights activists
LGBT YouTubers
YouTubers who make LGBT-related content
People from Colchester
Transgender academics
Transgender scientists
LGBT media personalities
Transgender men
20th-century LGBT people
21st-century LGBT people
Transgender studies academics
LGBT psychologists